The Kobah railway station is a Malaysian railway station located at and named after the town of Kobah, Pendang, Kedah, Malaysia.

Services
When it opened in 2015, the station is served by ETS Transit Ipoh–Butterworth–Padang Besar. ETS Kuala Lumpur–Padang Besar does not stop, but just run through the station. In 2016 ETS Transit was replaced by KTM Komuter Northern Sector Butterworth–Padang Besar line.

See also
KTM Komuter Northern Sector

Reference

External links
A train journey from Kobah to Padang Besar

Pendang District
Railway stations in Kedah
Railway stations opened in 2015